Husby AIK is a Swedish football club located in Dala-Husby.

Background
Husby AIK currently plays in Division 4 Dalarna which is the sixth tier of Swedish football. They play their home matches at the Husbyvallen in Dala-Husby.

The club is affiliated to Dalarnas Fotbollförbund.

Season to season

Footnotes

External links
 AIK – Official website
 Husby AIK on Facebook

Football clubs in Dalarna County